Arthur Ashe was the reigning champion of the singles event at the ABN World Tennis Tournament and, seeded first, successfully defended his title after a victory in the final against unseeded Bob Lutz 6–3, 6–3.

Seeds

Draw

References

External links
 ITF tournament edition details

1976 in Dutch tennis
1976 World Championship Tennis circuit
1976 ABN World Tennis Tournament